The Blackett effect, also called gravitational magnetism, is the hypothetical generation of a magnetic field by an uncharged, rotating body.  This effect has never been observed.

History
Gravitational magnetism was proposed by the German-British physicist Arthur Schuster as an explanation for the magnetic field of the Earth, but was found nonexistent in a 1923 experiment by H. A. Wilson.  The hypothesis was revived by the British physicist P. M. S. Blackett in 1947 when he proposed that a rotating body should generate a magnetic field proportional to its angular momentum.  This was never generally accepted, and by the 1950s even Blackett felt it had been refuted., pp. 39–43

The Blackett effect was used by the science fiction writer James Blish in his series Cities in Flight (1955–1962) as the basis for his fictional stardrive, the spindizzy.

References

Magnetism in astronomy
Gravity